Michael Disa (born February 14, 1965) is an American film director, screenwriter, and animator. He began working as an animator at Disney in the mid-1990s, where he was involved with several films up until the late-2000s. During this time, he also worked on non-Disney animated films, including Looney Tunes: Back in Action, and Barnyard. He made his directorial debut with The Origin of Stitch, Disney's 2005 direct-to-DVD short sequel to Lilo & Stitch. At one point he was attached to direct a computer-animated prequel to Disney's 1937 film Snow White and the Seven Dwarfs, but he dropped out due to creative differences, and the project was cancelled. After growing disillusioned with Disney, Disa left the studio to become an independent filmmaker. His first feature film, Hoodwinked Too! Hood vs. Evil was released in 2011. Disa followed this with Postman Pat: The Movie, which was released in 2014.

Early life
Disa was raised on the south side of Chicago, Illinois, near Marquette Park. His parents, Mike and Judy, were both graduates of Northern Illinois University, and his father worked as an art teacher for forty-two years at Curie Metropolitan High School and Harper High School.
He grew up in a large Irish Catholic family and served as an altar boy at St. Francis of Assisi Parish, where his uncle was a pastor.

Disa attended St. Joseph High School and graduated from Northern Illinois University in 1987 with degrees in art and computer programming.

Career
Disa moved to Los Angeles, California in 1990, where he was homeless for six months until he found a job doing digital cleanup of individual animation frames on educational CDs for $1.50 a frame. He went on to do effects works on films, video game design, freelance work on the animated television series Tiny Toons Adventures, and animation for Hanna-Barbera Productions. He eventually joined as an animator at the Walt Disney Company, where he worked on Pocahontas (1995), The Hunchback of Notre Dame (1996), Hercules (1997), Mulan (1998), Tarzan (1999), Fantasia 2000 (2000), The Tigger Movie (2000), Atlantis: The Lost Empire (2001), Treasure Planet (2002), Home on the Range (2004), and Pooh's Heffalump Movie (2005). He also worked on Looney Tunes: Back in Action (2003), before spending a year developing a film called Wings with Warner Bros. that ultimately was not produced. He then directed and co-wrote The Origin of Stitch (2005), a direct-to-DVD short sequel to Disney's 2002 Oscar-nominated film Lilo & Stitch. The Origin of Stitch earned a DVDX award nomination for best additional original material.

Disa worked as a storyboard artist on Nickelodeon's computer-animated film Barnyard (2006) and Disney's direct-to-DVD, computer-animated film Tinker Bell (2008). He left Disney for a time, but was asked to return to the studio to develop The Seven Dwarfs, a computer-animated prequel to Snow White and the Seven Dwarfs, which would have been produced by DisneyToon Studios. He left over creative differences when executives wanted Dopey to talk, a decision that he felt disrespected the original film in which the character is silent. The film was cancelled by 2007.
Growing frustrated with the creative restraints of working on studio produced films, Disa left to become an independent filmmaker. He spent a year working on Rob Zombie's animated film The Haunted World of El Superbeasto (2009), and was then asked to direct a sequel to the 2005 independent, computer-animated film Hoodwinked! Although he had not previously seen the original film, he was impressed with the script for the sequel and was announced as the film's director in March 2007.  The film finished production in 2009 and was originally scheduled for release in January 2010, but its release was delayed by its distributor, The Weinstein Company. The film's production company, Kanbar Entertainment, claimed that this breached an agreement and sued The Weinstein Company in March 2010. This gave Disa six months to direct the direct-to-DVD animated films Dante's Inferno: An Animated Epic and Dead Space: Aftermath, both adaptations of video games by EA. Hoodwinked Too! Hood vs. Evil was released in April 2011.

Disa also voiced several characters in Hoodwinked Too! Hood vs. Evil such as Helmut, Spider, Rhino and HEA Agents 1 and 2.

In September 2011, Disa was announced as the director of Postman Pat: The Movie — You Know You're the One, a computer-animated, feature film adaptation of the British stop motion, children's television series Postman Pat. The film's release date was originally scheduled for May 2013, but was moved until May of the following year.

Disa also teaches at the California Institute of the Arts.

Personal life
Disa met his wife, Laura Hogan, while at Northern Illinois University. He is a Catholic and his patron saint is St. Michael, the patron saint of police officers. Many of his family members were police officers, including his grandfather, and St. Michael was his father's patron saint as well.

Filmography

References

External links

Animators from Illinois
American animated film directors
American male screenwriters
American male voice actors
Place of birth missing (living people)
American storyboard artists
American voice directors
American Roman Catholics
Living people
Northern Illinois University alumni
1965 births
Walt Disney Animation Studios people